Rivière-Blanche District (District 17) is a municipal district in Gatineau, Quebec. It is represented by Jean Lessard on Gatineau City Council. The district is named after the Blanche River, which flows through it.

The district is centred on the historic Templeton Village in the east end of the city. The District also includes the neighbourhoods of Sainte-Rose, La Soblimière and much of Templeton-Est, including all of rural Templeton-Est north of Quebec Route 148 and east of the Blanche River.

City councillors
Yvon Boucher (2001–2013)
Jean Lessard (2013–present)

Election results

2021

2017

2013

2009

2005

References

2009 Election Results 
District Map 
2005 results

Districts of Gatineau